The Ultimate Collection is a live album from the American swing revival band The Brian Setzer Orchestra, released in 2004.

Track listing

Disc 1
 "Intro"
 "James Bond Theme"
 "Hoodoo Voodoo Doll"
 "Good Rockin' Daddy"
 "Your True Love"
 "My Baby Only Cares For Me"
 "Brand New Cadillac"
 "Sittin' On It"
 "Ghost Radio"
 "(Every Time I Hear) That Mellow Saxophone"
 "Rumble in Brighton"
 "Route 66"
 "Rock This Town"
 "As Long As I'm Singin'"
 "Honky Tonk"

Disc 2
 "Hawaii Five-O"
 "This Cat's On a Hot Tin Roof"
 "Dirty Boogie"
 "Jumpin' East of Java"
 "Drive Like Lightning (Crash Like Thunder)"
 "Caravan"
 "I Won't Stand in Your Way"
 "Mystery Train"
 "Gene & Eddie"
 "Sleep Walk"
 "Stray Cat Strut"
 "Jump, Jive an' Wail"
 "Pennsylvania 6-5000"
 "Gettin' in the Mood"
 "Get Me to the Church on Time"
 "Rock This Town"

References

2004 live albums
The Brian Setzer Orchestra albums
Surfdog Records live albums